The Internal Security Agency, ISA is Poland's domestic counterintelligence and security agency. The ABW is responsible for analyzing, reporting and preventing threats to Poland's internal security, including terrorism, foreign espionage, arms smuggling, drug trafficking, organized crime, corruption and economic coercion. Its powers include arresting individuals, conducting searches and investigations, and combating terrorism with a specialized armed anti-terrorist force.

The ABW is headquartered on ul. Rakowiecka in the Mokotów district of Warsaw. As part of its institutional hierarchy, the Head of the ABW reports directly to the Prime Minister of Poland, who in turn provides oversight of the ABW, or can appoint a special minister to coordinate intelligence and security activities for oversight. The ABW is considered by the government of Poland to be one of the nation's special services.

History
The ABW was created under the premiership of Leszek Miller on 24 May 2002, following the Council of Ministers' submission of its legislation on the Internal Security Agency and Foreign Intelligence Agency bill to the Sejm for approval.  The legislation effectively split the previous national intelligence service, the Urząd Ochrony Państwa (UOP), into two separate components: the Agencja Bezpieczeństwa Wewnętrznego (ABW), responsible for domestic intelligence operations, and the Agencja Wywiadu (AW), dedicated to gathering and analyzing foreign intelligence outside Poland.

Mission and operations
In accordance to Article 5 of the 2002 Internal Security Agency and Foreign Intelligence Agency Law, the ABW is tasked to protect Polish citizens, property and the state in a number of fields. These operations include domestic counter-intelligence activities, ensuring economic security, counter-terrorism and weapons proliferation, combating organized crime, securing state classified information, and protecting Polish cyberspace operations. According to law, ABW investigations must be preceded by a warrant issued from a regional court after a submitted request from the ABW's Head. The ABW works closely with other security apparatuses in counter-intelligence and counter-terrorism operations to pool data, including the Agencja Wywiadu, the Policja, the Straż Graniczna and the Biuro Ochrony Rządu.

The ABW also monitors corruption among state agencies and officials. According to its 2009 report, the ABW monitored 82 state enterprises undergoing privatization, as well as monitored the flow of European Union funds to Polish coffers. Ministries of state have been subject to investigations from the ABW for financial irregularities, including the ministries for Finance, National Defence, Environment, Justice, Interior and Administration, and GDDKiA.

Among the agency's powers, the ABW reserves the right to arrest individuals, search individuals and premises, inspect cargo from land, water and air transport, and request assistance from other Polish security services and government bodies.

The ABW's central operations center is located in the Mokotów borough of Warsaw along ul. Rakowiecka, standing in proximity to Mokotów Prison and the Ministry of Interior and Administration. The ABW maintains offices in nearly all of Poland's major cities, including Białystok, Bydgoszcz, Gdańsk, Katowice, Kraków, Lublin, Łódź, Olsztyn, Opole, Poznań, Radom, Rzeszów, Szczecin, Warsaw, Wrocław and Zielona Góra. Additionally, the ABW maintains international liaison offices within Polish diplomatic missions in Berlin, Brussels, Kyiv, London, Moscow and Prague.

Internationally, the ABW works closely with the intelligence and security agencies of fellow NATO and European Union member states, as well as outside states including Afghanistan, Israel, Kazakhstan and Montenegro. The ABW also worked closely with the Security Service of Ukraine in preparation for the UEFA Euro 2012 over the coordination of security plans.

Oversight
The activities of the ABW, along with the other special services (including the AW and the CBA) are provided oversight by the Prime Minister of Poland directly, or through a specially appointed minister working within the Chancellery. The Head of the ABW reports to the prime minister regarding security matters of concern. The prime minister also retains the right to propose candidates to lead the ABW; nominated individuals are then subject to the opinion of the President of Poland. The president also reserves the right to receive information from the ABW Head regarding security concerns.

A Committee of Special Services under the Council of Ministers within the Chancellery retains responsibility of planning, coordinating and overseeing the activities of the ABW and all other special services. The agency's legal activities are tied to the Public Prosecutor General, who is regularly informed by the ABW's Head of the agency's course of actions. Additionally, the Special Services Committee within the Sejm evaluates the performance of the agency, giving opinion to budgetary concerns, investigations and cooperation among the special services.

Controversies
In the aftermath of the 2010 Polish Air Force Tu-154 crash, killing President Lech Kaczyński and other senior members of the armed forces and government, members of the Law and Justice party alleged that leaked memos showed the agency had spied on the late president and First Lady Maria Kaczyńska during a state visit to Georgia in 2008.

In May 2011, the ABW conducted a dawn raid on the home of the owner of AntyKomor.pl, a satirical website critical of Polish president Bronisław Komorowski, citing that the website was in breach of Article 135 of the Polish Penal Code for insulting the president. In response to opposition allegations of stifling free speech, Prime Minister Donald Tusk stated afterward that the agency was a victim of the penal code's legal vagueness. Later, Prime Minister Tusk criticized the agency for acting "overzealous."

Marcin Idzik, who served as the CEO in the years 2013-2015 of the state-owned arms firm Bumar (since renamed as Polski Holding Obronny-Polish Defense Holding) has alleged that in 2013 he asked for an investigation by the ABW of a former Bumar sales agent Pierre Dadak on the suspicions of fraud. Dadak has been very closely associated with Krzysztof Wegrzyn, a wealthy businessman and  former deputy defense minister, generally regarded as a member of the elite. Idzik claims that the ABW were unwilling to investigate Dadak, leading him to say: "I was the chief of the biggest Polish defense company and somebody wheedled money. For me, [is it] strange? Yeah, 400 percent." The ABW has refused to comment on the matter.

In June 2014, the ABW conducted a raid on the editorial office of "Wprost" newspaper, after "Wprost" published stenographic records of private conversations between country officials implicating them in many unconstitutional acts and bribery. The ABW used physical force on newspapers editor-in-chief Sylwester Latkowski in an attempt to illegally seize his laptop computer, after he refused to give it away without court warrant.

See also
History of Polish intelligence services - 1989–present

References

External links

 Agencja Bezpieczeństwa Wewnętrznego (official site)

Polish intelligence agencies
Mokotów
Domestic intelligence agencies